A prop is a movable object used by actors on a stage or set.

Prop may also refer to:

Common uses
An object which supports another, such as a(n):
 Construction prop, or jack post
 Mouth prop, used in dentistry
Pit prop, in mining, used to support the roof of a tunnel

Arts, entertainment, and media

 "Props" (Glee), an episode of Glee

Science and technology
 ProP (transporter), an osmosensory transporter
 Prop-, a prefix in chemistry
 Propylthiouracil (PROP), a thioamide drug

Sports
 Prop (rugby league), a rugby league position
 Prop (rugby union), a rugby union position

Other uses
 PROP (category theory), in mathematics
Prop, short for propeller, a fan used for vehicle propulsion
 Prop, short for proposition, an initiative or referendum put to a vote on a ballot
Prop-word, a linguistic term
 Proposition bet, in gambling
 Props, or propers, a slang term for proper respect, also embodied in the fist bump hand gesture

See also
 PROP (disambiguation)